India pale ale (IPA) is a hoppy beer style within the broader category of pale ale. 

The style of pale ale which became known as India pale ale was widespread in England by 1815, and would grow in popularity, notably as an export beer shipped to India (which was under the control of the  British East India Company until 1858) and elsewhere.

History

The pale ales of the early 18th century were lightly hopped and quite different from today's pale ales. By the mid-18th century, pale ale was mostly brewed with coke-fired malt, which produced less smoking and roasting of barley in the malting process, and hence produced a paler beer. One such variety of beer was October beer, a pale well-hopped brew popular among the landed gentry, who brewed it domestically; once brewed it was intended to cellar two years.

Among the first brewers known to export beer to India was George Hodgson's Bow Brewery, on the Middlesex-Essex boundary. Its beers became popular among East India Company traders' provisions in the late 18th century for being two miles up the Lea from the East India Docks, and Hodgson's liberal credit line of 18 months. Ships exported this beer to India, among them his October beer, which benefited exceptionally from conditions of the voyage and was apparently highly regarded among its consumers in India. The brewery came into the control of Hodgson's son early in the next century, but his business practices alienated customers. During the same period, several Burton breweries lost their export market in Continental Europe, including Scandinavia and Russia when the Napoleonic blockade was imposed, and Burton brewers were seeking a new export market for their beer.

At the behest of the East India Company, Allsopp's brewery developed a strongly-hopped pale ale in the style of Hodgson's for export to India. Other Burton brewers, including Bass and Salt quickly followed Allsopp's lead. Perhaps as a result of the advantages of Burton water in brewing, Burton India pale ale was preferred by merchants and their customers in India, but Hodgson's October beer clearly influenced the Burton brewers' India pale ales.

London East End brewer Charrington's trial shipments of hogsheads of "India Ale" to Madras and Calcutta in 1827 proved successful and a regular trade emerged with the key British agents and retailers: Griffiths & Co in Madras; Adam, Skinner and Co. in Bombay and Bruce, Allen & Co. in Calcutta.

Early IPAs, like those mentioned above, were only slightly higher in alcohol than most of the other beers brewed in their day and would not have been considered strong ales; however, more of the wort was well-fermented, meaning few residual sugars, and the beer was strongly hopped. The common story that early IPAs were much stronger than other beers of the time, however, is a myth. While IPAs were formulated to survive long voyages by sea better than other styles of the time, porter was also successfully shipped to India and California. 

It is clear that by the 1860s, India pale ales were widely brewed in England, and that they were much more attenuated and highly hopped than porters and many other ales.

Demand for the export style of pale ale, which had become known as "India pale ale", developed in England around 1840 and India pale ale became a popular product in England. In 1837, Hodgson's IPA typically cost 6/6 (£) for a dozen pint bottles, the same as Guinness Double Stout, 53% more than the 4/3 (£) a dozen for those of porter. Some brewers dropped the term "India" in the late 19th century, but records indicated that these "pale ales" retained the features of earlier IPAs. American, Australian, and Canadian brewers manufactured beer with the label IPA before 1900, and records suggest that these beers were similar to English IPA of the era.

IPA style beers started being exported to other colonial countries, such as Australia and New Zealand, around this time with many breweries dropping the 'I' in 'IPA' and simply calling them Pale Ales or Export Pales. Kirkstall Brewery and many competitors sent much export beer across the world by steam ship to auction off to wholesalers upon arrival.

United Kingdom
India pale ale was well known as early as 1815, but gained popularity in the British domestic market sometime before then. By World War I, IPA in Britain had diverged into two styles, the premium bottled IPAs of around 1.065 specific gravity and cask-conditioned draught IPAs which were among the weakest beers on the bar. For instance Bass was 1.065 OG and 6.4% ABV, but in 1912 Whitbread's draught IPA was 1.049 and less than 5% ABV, at a time when the average British beer was 1.055. Like all British beers, their strength declined during World War I and by 1923 Bass was 1.055  and Whitbread IPA was a bottled beer of 1.036 and 3.7% (compared to their standard X Mild at 1.042 and their draught bitter at 1.042). Greene King IPA (3.7%) and Charles Wells Eagle IPA (3.6%) are examples of IPAs in this tradition.

Worthington's White Shield is an example of a historic India Pale Ale, first brewed in 1829 principally for export to the British Empire. By the 1960s White Shield had become a cult drink brewed in small quantities for a dedicated following, but it found renewed popularity in the early 1970s when the demand for real ale grew in the UK.

The revival of IPA in modern times dates to a seminar on Burton pale ales organised by publican Mark Dorber at his pub, the White Horse, Parson's Green, in 1990. That led to a pale ale festival in 1992 and an IPA festival in 1993, for which Bass brewed a 7.2% beer inspired by Bass Continental, originally brewed for the Belgian market before World War II and based on Bass recipes going back to the 1850s. Dorber and Roger Protz then organised an IPA conference in 1994 at Whitbread's brewery in London, attended by brewers from both sides of the Atlantic. The influence of this meeting persists, for instance Brooklyn Brewery's East India IPA is based on the beer that Garrett Oliver took there.

In the 21st century, US-influenced IPA is one of the most popular beer styles in the UK. In 2019, Brewdog's Punk IPA was the country's best selling craft beer in the on-trade and Swannay's Muckle IPA won overall craft keg gold in SIBA's Independent Beer Awards.

United States

In the late 20th century craft beer revolution in the United States, brewers began seeking out old beer styles that had fallen out of vogue; Ballantine IPA, which had been made in the U.S. since 1890 until the 1990s, proved inspirational. The traditional IPA style was well-suited to model the intense flavour and aroma of American hops. Bert Grant of Yakima Brewing and Malting identified that Cascade and Chinook hops, grown locally in Yakima, Washington, provided strong flavours when showcased in an IPA. The boom in popularity for IPA as a style spread down the west coast of the United States, then across the United States and eventually the world. It is estimated that over 40% of craft beer brewed in the United States can be classified as an IPA. 

As the Oxford Companion to Beer notes: "IPA is now the signature of craft brewers worldwide. Fittingly for an export beer, brewers from Australia to Scandinavia are creating new beers, mostly inspired by the American take on the style, but often adding a regional twist of their own."

Black IPA 
Black IPA (also known as Cascadian Dark Ale (CDA) or American Black Ale), is not pale in color. Black IPAs share the bitter hoppy flavours of their IPA cousins; however, the use of roasted malts gives them a much darker malty flavour. Greg Noonan of Vermont Pub & Brewery created the first black IPA for sale on draught only in the pub in the early 1990s, but it didn't become popular in the United States until 2009.

Brut IPA 
A crisp, dry IPA, the Brut IPA was invented by Kim Sturdavant, head brewer at San Francisco's Social Kitchen and Brewery. To make a brut IPA, brewers add the enzyme amyloglucosidase to remove sugars.

Double IPA 
Double IPAs (also referred to as Imperial IPAs) are a stronger, very hoppy variant of IPAs that typically have alcohol content above 7.5% by volume. The style is claimed to have originated with Vinnie Cilurzo, currently the owner of Russian River Brewing Company in Santa Rosa, California, in 1994 at the now-defunct Blind Pig Brewery in Temecula, California.

New England IPA 
New England IPA (NEIPA, also referred to as Hazy IPA or Juicy IPA or, less frequently, Vermont IPA)  was invented by John Kimmich in 2004 at the Alchemist Brewery in Waterbury, Vermont. Characterized by juicy citrus and floral flavours, with an emphasis on hop aroma with lower bitterness, they also have a smooth consistency or mouthfeel, and a hazy appearance. These characteristics are achieved using a combination of brewing techniques, including the use of particular strains of yeast, the timing of adding the hops, and adjusting the chemistry of the water. New England IPAs do not necessarily need to be brewed in New England. It was officially recognized as a separate beer style, the Juicy or Hazy India Pale Ale, by the Brewers Association in 2018. A variation on the style is the milkshake IPA, which adds lactose and occasionally fruit to make a New England IPA more creamy.

Triple IPA 
Triple IPAs are characterized by higher hop flavours and higher alcohol content, with alcohol content usually over 10% ABV.

West Coast IPA 
West Coast IPAs are known for being low in malt content, very clear, and dry with a focus on the hops.

White IPA 

White IPAs combine the flavours of an American IPA and a Belgian-style wheat beer.

India pale lager / Cold IPA 
India pale lager (IPL) or Cold IPA is a hoppy beer style inspired by India pale ale. But unlike IPAs, IPLs are fermented with a lager yeast strain at lower, and hence, colder lager fermentation temperatures. They generally combine a crisp lager finish with amplified hops.

See also 
 Craft brewery and microbrewery

Explanatory footnotes

Citations

General bibliography

Further reading
 Brown, Pete (2009), Hops & Glory: One Man's Search for the Beer That Built the British Empire, Pan Macmillan

External links
 

Beer styles